The 1984-85 Four Hills Tournament took place at the four traditional venues of Oberstdorf, Garmisch-Partenkirchen, Innsbruck and Bischofshofen, located in Germany and Austria, between 30 December 1984 and 6 January 1985.

Results

Overall

References

External links 
  

Four Hills Tournament
Four Hills Tournament
Four Hills Tournament
Four Hills Tournament
Four Hills Tournament
Four Hills Tournament
Four Hills Tournament
Four Hills Tournament